Lajo Dada (also known as Langu Himal) is a mountain peak in Dhaulagiri Zone, Gandaki Province of western-central Nepal.

Location 
This peak was not accessible to the public until 2014, when it was opened for climbing by the Nepalese government.

Climbing history 
On October 17, 2017, a three-member Japanese team made the first ascent of Lajo Dada. All three were members of Tomon Alpine Club and graduates of Waseda University — Norifumi Fukuda, Kojuro Hagihara, and Yudai Suzuki.

References 

Six-thousanders of the Himalayas
Mountains of Nepal
Dhaulagiri Zone